Saint-Théophile is a municipality in the Municipalité régionale de comté de Beauce-Sartigan in Quebec, Canada on the Canada–United States border. It is part of the Chaudière-Appalaches region and the population is 702 as of 2021. It is named after reverend Théophile Montminy, who had been chosen by the archdiocese to find a proper location for a church.

Saint-Théophile lies next to the border with Maine, and there is a border crossing on Route 173 within the municipality, in the hamlet of Armstrong. The Armstrong custom office is the third in importance in Quebec.

References

Commission de toponymie du Québec
Ministère des Affaires municipales, des Régions et de l'Occupation du territoire

Municipalities in Quebec
Incorporated places in Chaudière-Appalaches